Peter Leonard, the son of author Elmore Leonard, is an American author of crime novels.

In 1980, Peter was the founding partner of the advertising agency Leonard Mayer & Tocco. For nearly thirty years LM&T created award-winning advertising for Volkswagen of America, Audi of America, Hiram Walker, and Pennzoil.

He wrote his first novel, Quiver, in 2007; he has since published eight more novels and retired from advertising in 2009 to write fiction full time.

He is the father of four children and lives in Michigan (native of Detroit) with his wife, Julie, and his dog, Sam.

He is the author of:
 Quiver
 Trust Me
 All He Saw Was The Girl
 Voices of the Dead
 Back from the Dead (sequel to Voices of the Dead)
 Eyes Closed Tight
 Unknown Remains
 Raylan Goes To Detroit
 Sweet Dreams

External links
 Peter Leonard website
 CNN Interview
 The Telegraph - Interview with Elmore and Peter Leonard
 Detroit News

References
 Review of Unknown Remains in Bookreporter
 Review of Eyes Closed Tight in Spinetingler Magazine
 Review of Back from the Dead in The Guardian
 Review of Voices of the Dead in The Guardian
 Review of All He Saw Was The Girl in Independent
 Review of Trust Me in The Guardian
 Review of Quiver in The Guardian
 Peter Leonard Official Website

Place of birth missing (living people)
Year of birth missing (living people)
Living people
21st-century American novelists
American male novelists
21st-century American male writers